Karl Leon Hawley (born 6 December 1981) is an English professional footballer who plays for Sutton Coldfield. He has represented the England C team.

Career
Born in Walsall, West Midlands, Hawley started his career for his hometown team Walsall but only played one league game. While at the Bescot Stadium he also spent loan spells at Raith Rovers and Hereford United, where he scored once against Burton Albion.

After his release by Walsall in 2004, Hawley joined Southern Football League side Hednesford Town, but only made one start for the Pitmen, playing in a league game against Hinckley United. He was again released towards the end of the 2003–04 season. Hawley joined Conference team Carlisle United in the summer of 2004 and played a part in their return to the Football League. He was the League Two top scorer in the 2005–06 season, forming a successful partnership with Michael Bridges as Carlisle achieved a second successive promotion to League One. Hawley was voted League Two Fans' Player of the Year and was part of the League Two Team of the Year. In May 2007, Hawley was offered an improved contract by Carlisle manager Neil McDonald, but Hawley rejected the offer and left the club on 11 May 2007. In three seasons for Carlisle United he was the club's top scorer.

He signed for Championship side Preston North End on 14 June 2007, on a three-year contract.

After making 26 appearances and 3 goals in League and 2 in FA Cup at his first season for Preston, Hawley suffered poor forms for Preston in his second season and get less playing time under manager Alan Irvine. Also during his time at Preston, Hawley also struggled to replicate the goalscoring form he showed at Carlisle and joined Northampton Town for a one months loan
where he made 11 appearances and scoring two. Afterwards, Hawley returned to the club despite Northampton Town was keen to extend his contract.
Afterwards his loan finish with Northampton, Hawley returns to Preston and as made just five substitute appearances in the League and 2 starts in League Cup and eventually Hawley join Colchester United on month loan deal along with Neal Trotman and made 4 appearances.

He signed for League Two side Notts County on 3 August 2009, on a three-year contract for an undisclosed fee to revive his career. In his first season for Preston, Hawley made total of 38 appearances (31 in League, 6 in FA Cup, 1 in League Cup and 1 in Football League Trophy) and scoring 4 (3 in league and 1 in FA Cup). Under manager of Cotterill, Short, Paul Ince and Martin Allen, Hawley fell out with favour due to that he has struggled to make an impact for Notts County and his poor performance struck again. In May 2012 he was released by Notts County, along with 12 other players.

On 31 January 2012 Hawley signed, on loan until the end of season, for Crawley Town. However, Hawley made four appearances and returned to Notts County, with another disappointing loan spell.

Having been released, Hawley went on a trial at Doncaster Rovers. On 7 September 2012, he signed a short-term deal with League 1 side Scunthorpe United. At Scunthorpe United, Hawley made an impressive display at the club, with five goals in seventeen appearances. In January, Hawley signed a new contract, with the club until the end of the season as his old deal expires in January.

On 1 July 2013 Hawley signed a two-year deal with Torquay United, scoring 3 goals in 30 appearances. However, on 29 August 2014, Hawley and the club agreed to terminate his contract by mutual consent. On 5 September 2014 Hawley signed a one-year deal with Conference Premier Alfreton Town. On 11 October 2014 Hawley scored two goals for Alfreton against him former club in a 4–2 home win in front of the BT Sport cameras. At the end of the season Alfreton chose not to give Hawley a new contract.

In the summer of 2015 Hawley signed for Stourbridge.

2017 karl retired from football

Coaching career
After a successful spell at Stourbridge he left at the end of the season for League 2 side Mansfield Town to become a first team coach.

On 30 October 2017, Hawley was hired as a temporary manager. He left the job again on 12 November 2017.

Career statistics

Honours

Club
Carlisle United
 Football League Two: 2005–06
 Conference National play-offs: 2004–05

Individual
 PFA Team of the Year (2): 2005–06 Football League Two, 2006–07 Football League Two
 Football League Two Player of the Year: 2006–07
Evo-Stik League Supporter's Player of the Season: 2015–16
Evo-Stik League Premier Division Player of the Season: 2015–16

References

External links

Karl Hawley player profile at pnefc.net

1981 births
Living people
Sportspeople from Walsall
English footballers
Association football forwards
Walsall F.C. players
Raith Rovers F.C. players
Hereford United F.C. players
Hednesford Town F.C. players
Carlisle United F.C. players
Preston North End F.C. players
Northampton Town F.C. players
Colchester United F.C. players
Notts County F.C. players
Crawley Town F.C. players
Scunthorpe United F.C. players
Torquay United F.C. players
Alfreton Town F.C. players
Stourbridge F.C. players
Boston United F.C. players
Stafford Rangers F.C. players
Sutton Coldfield Town F.C. players
English Football League players
National League (English football) players
Scottish Football League players
Northern Premier League players
England semi-pro international footballers